Unión Deportiva Sámano is a Spanish football team located in Sámano, municipality Castro Urdiales, in the autonomous community of Cantabria. Founded in 1970 it currently plays in Tercera División RFEF – Group 3, holding home matches at Estadio Vallegon with a capacity of 1,000 spectators.

History
UD Sámano was founded in 1970.

Season to season

8 seasons in Tercera División
1 season in Tercera División RFEF

References

Football clubs in Cantabria
Association football clubs established in 1970
1970 establishments in Spain